This article is part of the history of rail transport by country series

In 1856 started the studies to make the first railway of the country that would go from Asunción to Paraguarí. With the concession of the company to English hands the railroad extended to Encarnación.

In the area of urban rail transit, the capital city of Asunción was served by trams from 1871 until around 1995.

The railways in the Americas

The beginnings of the railways in America were in 1831 when the steam railway arrived in the town of Albany, NY, United States. On August 9 of the same year, with the still primitive machine called “Bull” imported from England, was made the first journey of this locomotive that pulled three small coaches with a capacity of only 6 passengers each.

It was 36 years after, on October 23, 1867 that was inaugurated the railway that went from San Francisco to New York, known with the name of “Union Pacific Road”.

Later on, Cuba was the second country of this continent to have a railway. In 1834 the construction of a railway that would connect La Habana with Guinness (Unión) commenced; it covered  and was opened four years later, in 1838.

The third country to have one was British Guyana (Georgetown-Plaisance 1848), then Peru (Lima-Callao 1851) then Chile, with a railway that went from Caldera to Copiapó (1851). The construction was directed by the North-American Engineer William Wheelwright; this was followed by Brazil (Praia de Estrela-Fragoso in 1952).

In Argentina, the first railway was inaugurated on August 30, 1857. It extended from Buenos Aires to Moreno.

On February 22, 1862 started the work to build a railway that would go from Buenos Aires to Ensenada, and the person in charge was once again the Engineer Wheelwright.

The same Wheelwright directed the construction of the Argentine Central Railway, used to link Rosario with Córdoba that started on April 20, 1863.

In Paraguay the intentions to have a railway manifested in 1856, but only 5 years later was possible to have one working. On June 14, 1861 was made the first journey from the station to the port of Asunción, so it could be said that the railway in Paraguay was one of the first to function in South America.

A project on rails

The possibilities of starting the construction of the railway in Paraguay were given in 1854, during the government of Carlos Antonio López, who hired English engineers in charge of the studies made to start the first railway line that would go from Asunción to Paraguarí.

In 1856, soldiers of the army engineer corps worked on the tracks and platform. In England, the firm BLYTH proceeded to fulfill the requests of the Paraguayan government with locomotives, wagons, rails, etc.

The construction of the track Asunción-Paraguarí was in charge of George Paddison, an English engineer hired by the government.
All kinds of accessories for the stations were built from models, with local materials.

Between 1857 and 1859 the engineers George Thompson, Henry Valpy and Percy Burrell were incorporated in the project, which helped to speed the work.

The first local railway line started working in June 1861; it went on a short track from the central station in Asunción to Trinidad.
Six months later the track was extended to the city of Luque.

The extension was inaugurated on December 25 and according to the journal “El Semanario” it was a source of great joy for the citizens. “The locomotives have been functioning since 5 am until 12 pm, and it would be necessary to add three more trains to take the people that expected to get a ride and that came not only to Luque but also to Trinidad. In Luque were organized games, dances and a masquerade, in Trinidad, there were also bullfights” (transcript from the journal). 
In 1862 the rail tracks extended to Areguá.

Station Saint Francis

Of the public buildings that were finished before the war of 1870, the most noticeable are the Palace of Government and the Railway Station, which are still nowadays true icons of Asunción City.

The original name of the Central Railway Station was “Estación San Francisco” (Saint Francis Station), although it was originally known also as “Plaza San Francisco” (Saint Francis Square).

Today the building is still an attraction because of its architectonic proportions and its beauty, and it is not hard to imagine that it was even more outstanding in the time it was built. The architect Alonzo Taylor directed the construction. Taylor came from Europe in the ship “Río Blanco” on May 6, 1859 and he also directed the construction of the Palace of Government along with architect Raviza.

The journals of the time made many references to the Saint Francis Station. In 1863 the journal “El Semanario” wrote: “The construction work in the station is progressing well, soon the building will be complete and this beautiful construction will be considered one of the icons of the city”.

On July 30 of the same year, the journal also described a ball that took place in the main hall of the station, offered by chiefs and officers in honor to the President on his birthday.

Tramways

Asunción was served by a tram system for almost 125 years. The city's first tram line opened in 1871, initially using horse-drawn trams and steam-powered trams. Electric trams were introduced in 1913. The first electric trams were operated by the Asunción Tramway, Light & Power Company (ATL&P) and were built by the United Electric Car Company, of England. In 1914, the Compañía Americana de Luz y Tracción acquired the system after ATL&P's bankruptcy. Six trams were purchased from Società Italiana Ernesto Breda, in Italy, in the 1920s, and later from the American manufacturer J. G. Brill Company and in the 1930s and 1940s from Argentinian builders. 

The system reached its maximum extent in the 1930s, with 37 km of track served by 10 routes, worked by a fleet of 33 motor trams and 26 trailers. In 1945, when the direction of traffic flow on several streets in the city centre was reversed, tram lines 1–4 were closed, but CALT built a new line 5, between the city centre and the neighbourhood of Las Mercedes. The system was nationalized in 1948.  It was closed in 1973, but was reopened in 1975, and then-operator Administración del Transporte Eléctrico began to import used trams from the Brussels, Belgium, tram system, ultimately acquiring a total of 17 from Brussels by 1980. Only a single route, 5, was reopened in 1975, but route 9 reopened in 1978; however, the latter closed again the following year, leaving only route 5 in operation for the remainder of the system's history. After the mid-1980s, the only tramcars in service were the 9000 series, two-axle ex-Brussels cars built around 1960. The last tram service was discontinued around 1995, followed by formal closure in November 1997.

See also

History of Paraguay
Rail transport in Paraguay

References

External links

 Paraguay-fotos(Dead link, March 30th, 2021)
 Romanistik 

Paraguay
Rail
Rail transport in Paraguay

es:El Ferrocarril en el Paraguay